Ailbhe Smyth is an Irish academic, feminist and LGBTQ activist. She was the founding director of the Women's Education, Resource and Research Centre (WERRC), University College Dublin (UCD).

Education and academic career 
Ailbhe Smyth received a B.A. in English and French in 1966, and then an M.A. in 1968 from University College Dublin. She began lecturing in the French department at the age of 21. During this time, she became increasingly more politically aware and began following the global women's movement, which led her to set up the Women's Study Forum at the beginning of the 1980s. This was a space where women came together to discuss issues which were affecting them including: work, sex, relationships, childcare, discrimination and violence. This was a discussion group with a strong cultural ethos and they invited women writers, poet, artists to come and talk about interesting projects that they were involved with at the time. In 1990 Ailbhe Smyth started the department of Women's Studies in U.C.D. where she stayed until 2006.

Activism 
Ailbhe Smyth began her involvement in activism in the 1970s whilst a student as part of the women's liberation movement.

In 1990, she established the Women's Education, Research and Resource Centre (WERRC) at UCD and was head of Women's Studies from 1990 to 2006.

Ailbhe now works independently as a consultant and campaigner.

Smyth was a co-director of the Together for Yes national referendum campaign on abortion, and spokeswoman and convener for the Coalition to Repeal the Eighth Amendment. She is also a founding member of Marriage Equality, convenor of Feminist Open Forum, an organiser for Action for Choice, a board member of Equality and Rights Alliance.

She chaired the National LGBT Federation for over 10 years and in 2015  she received the 'Lifetime Achievement' award at the GALAS, Ireland's LGBTQ Awards Ceremony.

In 2019, Smyth was named as one of the Time 100 most influential people alongside the other co-directors of Together for Yes, Grainne Griffin and Orla O'Connor, in recognition of their roles within the campaign to legalise abortion in Ireland.

Ailbhe was twice nominated by the Minister for Education to serve on the board of the Higher Education Authority and has also served as a Trustee of the National Library of Ireland.

Ailbhe is currently Chair of Ballyfermot STAR Addiction Services, and also of Women's Aid. She is a member of the board of Age Action.

In March 2022 she was amongst 151 international feminists signing Feminist Resistance Against War: A Manifesto, in solidarity with the Feminist Anti-War Resistance initiated by Russian feminists after the Russian invasion of Ukraine.

In 2022, she was awarded the freedom of Dublin city.

References 

Living people
Alumni of University College Dublin
Irish LGBT rights activists
Irish women activists
Irish abortion-rights activists
Abortion in the Republic of Ireland
Year of birth missing (living people)
Lesbian academics
Irish lesbians
Women civil rights activists
21st-century LGBT people